Na Nova (known also by other names, Son Amer and Talaia d'en Cama) is a Spanish Iron Age Talaiotic settlement located on the island of Mallorca, near the resort of Cala Llombards. Although its entirety is highly altered, it has been designated a Bien de Interés Cultural. Its most characteristic structure is the talaiot, a tower-shaped megalithic structure which is in good conditions.

The inside is full of rubblestones, but the polylithic column still stands, as does the entrance with its stone lintel. The rest of the structures are partially razed and covered with more rubble, and have not been satisfactorily identified.

The site was densely and totally covered with bushes and trees until its first cleaning in 2016 and 2017. Then the structures became visible, and the first excavation began, which consisted mainly in removing the rubble to leave structures visible. After the 2020 campaign, the north face was totally uncovered and the south one partially revealed; its eastern face supports an ancient wall, while its western face supports a modern one (XIX century).

References

External links 
 Description of the settlement at the web Baleares antigua.

Archaeological sites in the Balearic Islands
Santanyí
Buildings and structures in Mallorca
Megalithic monuments in Spain
Prehistory of the Balearic Islands
Iron Age Spain